Pyatrowshchyna is a Minsk Metro station. It was opened on November 7, 2012, along with the metro stations of Hrushawka and Mikhalova.

Gallery

References

Minsk Metro stations
Railway stations opened in 2012